Rahasyam or rahasiyam may refer to:

 Chidambara Rahasiyam (disambiguation), a Hindu myth and related media
 Rahasyam (1967 film), a 1967 Telugu film
 Rahasyam (1969 film), a 1969 Malayalam language film